Ephraim Y. Levin, (February 22, 1933, Baltimore, Maryland, - November 20, 2020). 1957 BA and MA, 1953, MD, 1957, all at Johns Hopkins University. Internship and residencies at Johns Hopkins Hospital and Sinai Hospital of Baltimore. Married Ruth Lee Shefferman June 17, 1956; Four children: Joshua, Rebecca, Daniel, and Michael. Served in USPHS 1953-1998, on active duty 1958-1960 and 1974-1998. With Seymour Kaufman discovered the role of ascorbic acid in the enzymatic hydroxylation of dopamine to form norepinephrine, the first evidence for a specific metabolic function for this vitamin Fellowship with Konrad Bloch at Harvard University 1961-1963, under auspices of Sinai Hospital. On Faculty of Pediatrics at Johns Hopkins School of Medicine 1963-1974. Along with Vagn Flyger, demonstrated the partial deficiency of uroporphyrinogen cosynthetase in congenital erythropoietic porphyria of cattle and human beings, its occurrence in asymptomatic carriers of the disease, in fibroblasts as well as in bone marrow, and its probable cause of red bones in fox squirrels. He once beat Solomon Golumb in a chess game.

References

1933 births
2020 deaths
People from Baltimore
Johns Hopkins University alumni
Johns Hopkins School of Medicine alumni